Tooborac  is a town in Victoria, Australia.

Tooborac Post Office opened on 1 January 1872.

Tooborac has recently undergone a resurgence with the renovation of the Tooborac Hotel and the construction of a craft brewery. The 150-year-old two storey bluestone and ironstone hotel is a meeting place for locals and travellers alike.

Tooborac is known for its annual 'Octooberfest', a German Octoberfest themed event.

References

External links

Towns in Victoria (Australia)
Shire of Mitchell